AFC Wimbledon Women are a women's football team from London.

The club was founded after the ladies team representing Wimbledon F.C. decided to transfer to AFC Wimbledon, after the old club's relocation. The ladies team of Fulham F.C., known as Friends of Fulham, started its bonds with the name Wimbledon, when they voted yes on the decision to transfer to Wimbledon F.C., as a new entity. The AFC Wimbledon Ladies are now owned by The Dons Trust. On Sunday 24 October, AFC Wimbledon beat Walton Casuals 7–1 in the FA Cup 3rd Round Qualifying match meaning they qualify for the 1st Round where they will face Millwall Lionesses L.F.C.

From 2003 to 2006 it was one of the few Women's Premier League sides not to be affiliated with a club from the male Premiership or Football League.

Founded as AFC Wimbledon Ladies, the club changed its subname to 'Women' before the 2022-23 season.

Performance

References

External links
 Official website

Women's football clubs in England
Wimbledon F.C.
AFC Wimbledon
Women's football clubs in London
2003 establishments in England
FA Women's National League teams
Association football clubs established in 2003